Bolesław Leśmian (born Bolesław Lesman; January 22, 1877 – November 5, 1937) was a Polish poet, artist and member of the Polish Academy of Literature, one of the first poets to introduce Symbolism and Expressionism to Polish verse. Though largely a marginal figure during his lifetime, Leśmian is now considered one of Poland's greatest poets. He is, however, little known outside of his home country, mostly on account of his neologisms-rich idiosyncratic style, dubbed "almost untranslatable" by Czesław Miłosz and "the ultimate and overwhelming proof for the untranslatability of poetry" by noted Polish Shakespearean translator, Stanisław Barańczak.

Biography

Bolesław Leśmian was born January 22, 1877, in Warsaw, Congress Poland, Russian Empire to a family of Polonized Jewish intelligentsia. He spent his childhood and youth in Kyiv, where he graduated from the law faculty of Saint Vladimir University. In 1901, he returned to Warsaw. From there, he set off on a journey to various European cities, including Munich and Paris, where he married a painter, Zofia Chylińska. Heavily influenced by French modernists, Leśmian returned to Warsaw, where he became one of the founders of an experimental Artistic Theatre. There he also met one of his closest friends, Zenon Przesmycki, with whom he became involved in the publication of Chimera, an art newspaper.

Although he made his debut in 1895 (a series of poems published in Wędrowiec magazine), his works initially went unnoticed. To sound "more Polish", Leśmian adopted a slightly modified version of his surname which included typically Polish sounds (previously it had been Lesman). According to various conflicting sources, the author of the pen-name which eventually became his official surname was either the known poet and poet's uncle Antoni Lange, or a renowned bon-vivant of Warsaw, Franc Fiszer. The first booklet issued in Warsaw in 1912 (Sad Rozstajny) did not bring him much publicity either, and in 1912 Leśmian moved back to France. He returned in 1914.

From 1918 until 1934, he worked as a notary of large landed estates in Hrubieszów and then as a lawyer in Zamość. At the same time he published the best known of his books: Łąka (The Meadow, 1920) and Napój cienisty (Shadowy Drink, 1936). In 1933, he was accepted as a permanent member of the Polish Academy of Literature. In 1935, he moved back to Warsaw, where he died two years later. He is buried in Powązki Cemetery, in the Alley of the Meritorious, among other notable Polish writers, politicians and military men.

Leśmian and Chylińska had two daughters, one of who, Wanda "Dunia" Leśmianówna, would later marry British adventurer and traveller Denis Hills. Actress and singer Gillian Hills - famous for her brief appearances in Antonioni's Blowup and Kubrick's A Clockwork Orange in two similar scenes - was born of this marriage in 1944. Leśmian was also nephew of the famous poet and writer of the Young Poland movement, Antoni Lange, and the cousin of another notable poet of the epoch, Jan Brzechwa.

Work
To Polish readers, Leśmian's style is unique and easily recognizable, intuitively accessible despite its idiosyncrasy. In his poems, in a fantastical, mythical and fabulous environment - often inhabited with creatures taken from the Polish folklore and traditions - Leśmian expounds his life philosophy, revolving around his equally deep and personal fascinations with God and death. The protagonists of his works are usually "handicapped humans", struggling between Culture and Nature, unable to accept their in-between positions. For Leśmian, the only ones who can do this - the only ones able to live with both Culture and Nature simultaneously - are poets, the last examples of "the primitive mankind."

Relying heavily on "the vertiginous word-formation potential of Polish," Leśmian's style is especially notable for its numerous neologisms, many of which are still in use in everyday Polish language (as opposed to, say, Cyprian Norwid's similar experiments). Referred to as "leśmianisms" by subsequent scholars, these neologisms are usually the product of the versatile "prefix+verb/noun(+suffix)" formula natural to most Slavic languages, but peculiar to many other languages, rendering Leśmian's poetry "almost untranslatable" into English.

Some of Leśmian's favourite prefixes include those who imply a lack of certain qualities (like bez- or nie-, loosely, "without," or "non-"), leading certain scholars to dub him "the Dante of non-being." Considered one of the greatest Polish poets in history, Leśmian is certainly one of the most interesting artists of the interwar period, creator of a uniquely stylised Polish folk ballad and profoundly personal - and, nevertheless, popular - metaphysical lyrics. In addition, he is frequently mentioned as the most notable poet of erotic verses in the history of the Polish language.

Bibliography
 "Sad rozstajny", (Bifurcated Orchard, Warsaw, 1912)
 "Klechdy sezamowe" (Sesame Tales, Warsaw, 1913)
 "" (Adventures of Sindbad the Sailor, Warsaw, 1913)
 "Łąka" (Meadow, Warsaw, 1920)
 "Napój cienisty", (Shadowy Drink, Warsaw, 1936)
 "Dziejba leśna" (Forest Happenings, Warsaw, 1938)
 "Klechdy polskie" (Polish Tales, London 1956)
 "Skrzypek opętany" (Possessed Violin Player, Warsaw, 1985)
 "Pochmiel księżycowy" (Russian, Lunar the-day-after, Warsaw, 1987; Polish translation by Jerzy Ficowski)
 "Zdziczenie obyczajów pośmiertnych" (Savagery of Posthumous Habits, Cracow, 1998)
 "33 of the Most Beautiful Love Poems " (selected poems: Polish-English edition), New York, 2011; English translation by Marian Polak-Chlabicz)
 "Marvellations: The Best-Loved Poems" (selected poems: Polish-English edition), New York, 2014; English translation by Marian Polak-Chlabicz)
 "Beyond the Beyond" (selected poems: Polish-English edition), New York, 2017; English translation by Marian Polak-Chlabicz)

Footnotes

See also
 Polish literature
 List of Poles

References

Further reading

 Mortkowicz-Olczakowa, Hanna (1961). Bunt wspomnień. Państwowy Instytut Wydawniczy.
 Alexandra Chciuk-Celt, "Linguistic innovation in Boleslaw Lesmian," translation dissertation with heavily annotated double versions (verse and literal) of 68 poems, City University of New York Graduate Center, 1984.

External links
 
  
 
 translate 4 poems 1
 translate 4 poems 2
 Biography at Culture.pl
 Bolesław Leśmian at poezja.org
 The Greatest Poet You'll Never Read at Culture.pl

1877 births
1937 deaths
19th-century Polish Jews
Burials at Powązki Cemetery
Writers from Warsaw
People from Warsaw Governorate
19th-century Polish poets
Jewish poets
Polish erotica writers
Members of the Polish Academy of Literature